Serafim das Neves (29 August 1920 – 1989), was a Portuguese footballer who played as a defender.

Club career
Neves spent his entire career at Belenenses, where he won the Taça de Portugal in 1942, and the Primeira Divisão in 1947.

International career
Neves represented Portugal national team eighteen times and made his debut against Spain in Lisbon on 13 March 1945, in a 2–2 draw.

Honours

Club
 Belenenses
 Primeira Divisão: 1945–46
 Taça de Portugal: 1941–42

External links 
 
 
 

1920 births
1989 deaths
C.F. Os Belenenses players
Portugal international footballers
Portuguese footballers
Primeira Liga players
Association football defenders